Tarakeswar Degree College, established in 1986, is an undergraduate general and honours degree college in Tarakeswar in Hooghly district. It offers undergraduate courses in arts, commerce and sciences. It is affiliated to University of Burdwan.

History 
Sri Srimat Dandiswami Hrishikesh Ashram Mahanta Maharaj of Tarakeswar Math donated 3.5 acres of land for the purpose of establishing the college campus. Support from Member of Parliament Sri Anil Basu and Minister of West Bengal Fire & Emergency Services Department Sri Pratim Chatterjee, Sri Shankar Ray Chowdhury, Ex-General of Army & Member of Rajya Sabha, who madecontributions from their Local area development funds became instrumental in shaping the college.

Departments

Science

Physics
Mathematics
Computer Science
Chemistry

Arts and Commerce
 Bengali
English
History
Sanskrit
Geography
Philosophy
Political Science
Music
Sociology
Education
Physical Education
Business Administration
Accountancy
Economics
Auditing

Accreditation
Recently, Tarakeswar Degree College has been awarded a B grade by the National Assessment and Accreditation Council. The college is also recognized by the University Grants Commission. In November 2016, a new NAAC accreditation score of 2.43 points (B grade) was awarded.

See also

References

External links
 Tarakeswar Degree College

Colleges affiliated to University of Burdwan
Educational institutions established in 1986
Universities and colleges in Hooghly district
1986 establishments in West Bengal